Satipoella is a genus of beetles in the family Cerambycidae, containing the following species:

 Satipoella bufo (Thomson, 1868)
 Satipoella heilipoides Lane, 1964
 Satipoella ochroma Julio, 2003

References

Anisocerini